Ahn Gil-kang (born August 24, 1966) is a South Korean actor. He frequently appears as a supporting actor in director Ryoo Seung-wan's films, such as Die Bad (2000), Crying Fist (2005), The City of Violence (2006), and Dachimawa Lee (2008). Ahn also played a supporting role in the period drama series Queen Seondeok (2009), for which he received a Golden Acting Award at the MBC Drama Awards.

Filmography

Film

Television series

Web shows

Theater
View from the Mirror (거울 보기)
Saint Joan of the Stockyards
Spring Day (봄날)
The Cypress Tree in the Front Yard (뜰 앞에 잣나무)

Awards and nominations

References

External links

1966 births
Living people
20th-century South Korean male actors
21st-century South Korean male actors
South Korean male television actors
South Korean male film actors
Place of birth missing (living people)